Japan Italy Racing, more commonly known as JiR, is a Monte Carlo based motorcycle racing team which competed in the MotoGP series from 2005 to 2008 and from 2010 to 2015 in the Moto2 class.

Team setup
The team was founded by Gianluca Montiron together with Honda Motor Europe founder Tetsuo Iida. Since the team's founding, Montiron has diversified the investments keeping the Head Office as the team's central core, although all its activities are independent. The Monaco-based company develops commercial and sport interests, including marketing and communication initiatives – such as the brand's internationalisation. Motorsport, real estate investments and corporate social responsibility (CSR) are the services provided by JiR's different companies.

JiR Italy
The Italian facility is well equipped for promotional activities and is located near to the Motodromo circuit, the 7 Laghi go kart and jet ski tracks.

SCI JiR
SCI JiR is a real estate company that has the property of the team's facilities in Castelletto di Branduzzo and in the French Riviera.

History

MotoGP (2005–2008)
A 3rd-place finish at the Japanese Grand Prix was the team's best result. The team used the same package for the  season, but was unable to repeat the 2005 results finishing twelfth in the championship, with a best result of fifth at the Portuguese Grand Prix. In , Shinya Nakano replaced Tamada as the rider of the new 800cc Honda RC212V. The motorcycle did not achieve the results expected finishing in seventeenth position.

They were re-branded as JiR Team Scot after a joint venture with Team Scot. The team ran also Yuki Takahashi in the 250cc class; Dovizioso finished fifth overall in the MotoGP standings.

Moto2 (2010–2015)

In  the team took part in the new Moto2 class on a TSR built, Motobi branded chassis ridden by Simone Corsi and Mattia Pasini, although the latter was replaced during the season by Yusuke Teshima and Alex de Angelis. Corsi achieved third place twice, while de Angelis scored two podiums, including a victory from pole position in the Australian Grand Prix. In , the team ran only one bike with de Angelis, who took another victory in Australia and clinched fourth place in the final standings.

Zarco finished in tenth place in the championship standings, the best-placed rookie. In  former 125cc world champion Mike Di Meglio joined the team – he finished the season in 20th place in the championship, despite missing the final seven races due to a broken sacrum sustained at Brno. Five riders replaced him over those races, but no further points were accrued.

The 2014 Moto2 season started with a young rider project with Japanese GP2 champion Kohta Nozane but the premature death of his father during the off-season discouraged his participation. He was replaced by Tetsuta Nagashima, but his season was shortened by an injury suffered at the British Grand Prix. He returned for the final race at Valencia, having been replaced by Federico Caricasulo, Kenny Noyes and Tomoyoshi Koyama in between. None of the riders scored points during the season.

In 2015 the Swiss rider Randy Krummenacher joined the team, but the team left the championship at the end of the season.

Results

Summary

 Competed for other teams during the season.

MotoGP results
(key)

References

External links

Motorcycle racing teams
Motorcycle racing teams established in 2005
2005 establishments in Monaco
Motorcycle racing teams disestablished in 2015
2015 disestablishments in Europe